Idiopidae, also known as armored trapdoor spiders, is a family of mygalomorph spiders first described by Eugène Simon in 1889. They have a large body similar to tarantulas.

Description

In most species the males have a spur on their legs, which is used to immobilise the female and prevent her from biting during the mating process. 
Idiopidae build burrows, and some species close these with a door.
Prothemenops siamensis from Thailand, which is about 2 cm long, builds its retreat in a streamside vertical earth bank in lower montane rainforest. Each burrow has two or three entrances that lead into a main tube. Its lateral posterior spinnerets are elongated.

The oldest known idiopid, Number 16, died at the age of 43 years.

Genera

As of 2019, the World Spider Catalog accepts the following genera:

Arbanitis L. Koch, 1874 — Australia
Blakistonia Hogg, 1902 — Australia
Bungulla Rix, Main, Raven & Harvey, 2017 — Australia
Cantuaria Hogg, 1902 — New Zealand, Australia
Cataxia Rainbow, 1914 — Australia
Ctenolophus Purcell, 1904 — South Africa
Eucanippe Rix, Main, Raven & Harvey, 2017
Eucyrtops Pocock, 1897 — Australia
Euoplos Rainbow, 1914 — Australia
Gaius Rainbow, 1914 — Australia
Galeosoma Purcell, 1903 — South Africa, Mozambique, Botswana
Genysa Simon, 1889 — Madagascar
Gorgyrella Purcell, 1902 — Zimbabwe, Tanzania, South Africa
Heligmomerus Simon, 1892 — Africa, Asia
Hiboka Fage, 1922 — Madagascar
Idiops Perty, 1833 — South America, Africa, Asia, Saint Vincent and the Grenadines
Idiosoma Ausserer, 1871 — Australia
Neocteniza Pocock, 1895 — Central America, South America
Prothemenops Schwendinger, 1991 — Thailand
Scalidognathus Karsch, 1892 — India, Sri Lanka
Segregara Tucker, 1917 — South Africa
Titanidiops Simon, 1903 — Morocco

See also
 List of Idiopidae species

References

External links

 Find-a-spider Guide: Images of several species
 

 
Mygalomorphae families